Jugend Rettet is a non-governmental organization (NGO) from Berlin. Its goal is to save drowning persons at the Mediterranean Sea. Operations are conducted with the Iuventa, a ship that sails under Dutch flag. This ship was seized in August 2017 after suspicion of cooperation with migrant smugglers.

The organization is divided into three divisions. First there is the Iuventa crew, with the straplines "Solidarity at Sea" and "Solidarity is not a Crime". The name Iuventa originates from the Roman god of youth and courage. Second, there is a department to encourage political awareness of certain issues. Third, there is a discussion platform for the right of asylum.

During a session of the Italian parliament on 10 May 2017, a prosecutor accused Jugend Rettet of working together with migrant smugglers. Jugend Rettet denied the allegations. The organization Frontex (European Border and Coast Guard Agency) criticized the behaviour of NGOs at the Libyan coast waters, and reproached their unwillingness to cooperate with the official organizations. In August 2017, Jugend Rettet refused to sign the code of conduct for NGOs set up by the Italian government.

Ships 
The Iuventa is a 32.92-meter former fishing vessel built in 1962 at the shipyard Scheepswerf Vooruit in Zaandam. Originally named Maria, and renamed Waterman II in 1969 and Jonas in 1971, the ship was initially used for fishing. In 1990, she was sold and converted into an offshore support ship, now named Telco Suez. She was resold in late 2001 and renamed Alk Explorer. In 2016, the ship became the property of the Jugend Rettet group, and was rebuilt for rescuing purposes under the new name Iuventa. In 2016 and 2017 she operated in the Mediterranean Sea, mainly assisting shipwrecked refugees and economic migrants.

On 10 May 2019 the crew of the Iuventa was honored by the Swiss Paul Grüninger Foundation with a human rights award for saving the lives of around  people in the central Mediterranean Sea.

Seizing of the Iuventa 
On 2 August 2017 the public prosecutor of the Italian municipality of Trapani seized the Iuventa on allegation of cooperation with migrant smugglers and the encouraging of illegal immigration. The confiscation was preceded by a year of investigations by the Italian police. The prosecutor produced witness reports, photo material, video material and sound recordings which should prove that the organization had not tried to rescue people, but taken onboard illegal immigrants during calm sea conditions. The unimpaired vessels of the migrant smugglers subsequently would cruise back. However, presenting at the Manifesta 12 in Palermo, Italy, a Goldsmiths, University of London-based Forensic Oceanography and Forensic Architecture team of researchers stated that the crew of the Iuventa would neither have communicated with nor would have returned empty boats back to the traffickers. 

Jugend Rettet disputed the seizing, but on 23 April 2018 the supreme court of Italy confirmed the decision of the court in Trapani that the vessel stays seized awaiting further investigations. In July 2018, investigations were started against some members of Jugend Rettet, including the ship's captain, Pia Klemp. They are accused of aiding illegal immigration and could face up to 20 years in prison.

See also 

 Hellenic Rescue Team
 Mediterranea Saving Humans
 Migrant Offshore Aid Station
 No Border network
 Proactiva Open Arms
 Sea-Watch
 SOS Méditerranée

References

Further reading
  [9:57 min] (NB. Filmed on Iuventa'''s fourth mission in 2017.)
    [13:43 min] (NB. Filmed on Iuventa'' in 2017.)

Non-profit organisations based in Berlin
Sea rescue organizations